Veliki Bastaji   is a village in Croatia. It is connected by the D34 highway.

References

Populated places in Bjelovar-Bilogora County